Maria da Conceição Nobre Cabral is a Guinea-Bissauan politician who was Minister of Foreign Affairs from 2007 to 2009.

Cabral was appointed as Foreign Minister on April 18, 2007, as part of the government of Prime Minister Martinho Ndafa Kabi. She was chosen for the post by President Nino Vieira.

Cabral was married to a former ambassador of Guinea-Bissau to the United States. Currently, she is the President of a NGO called Scorpius-Centaurus.

References

Year of birth missing (living people)
Living people
Bissau-Guinean women diplomats
Bissau-Guinean diplomats
Female foreign ministers
Foreign Ministers of Guinea-Bissau
21st-century women politicians
Women government ministers of Guinea-Bissau